The John Rankin Lock (formerly named Lock D) is part of the Tennessee-Tombigbee Waterway (popularly known as the Tenn-Tom).

The lock is part of a series of five locks within a stretch of the Tenn-Tom known as the "Chain of Lakes" or "Canal" section.  The lock has a lift of 30 feet.

Formerly known simply as Lock D, the lock was later renamed for John E. Rankin, a former Mississippi First District Representative in the United States House of Representatives and an early champion of the Tenn-Tom.

Buildings and structures in Itawamba County, Mississippi
Tennessee–Tombigbee Waterway